Walding is a municipality in the district of Urfahr-Umgebung in the Austrian state of Upper Austria.

Population

See also
Überlendner-Siedlung
Walding Zoo

References

External links

 Walding official website

Cities and towns in Urfahr-Umgebung District